Seashore is a free and open-source image editor for macOS, similar to Photoshop/GIMP, with a simpler Cocoa user interface. Seashore uses GIMP's native file format, XCF, and has support for a handful of other graphics file formats, including full support for TIFF, PNG, JPEG, JPEG2000, and HEIC and read-only support for BMP, PDF, SVG and GIF. Seashore offers fewer features than Photoshop/GIMP, but is intended to be easy-to-use and to run natively on macOS. It includes layers and alpha channel support, gradients and transparency effects, anti-aliased brushes, tablet support and plug-in filters.

After several years without maintenance, development was restarted by Robert Engels in 2017 to allow it to run on newer versions of macOS. Seashore version 3.16 was released in December 2022 and is considered to be stable.

The latest release is distributed via the Apple Mac App Store.

Features
Seashore has many of the basic features found in graphics editing software, including:
 Full support for the XCF file format
 Reading and writing TIFF, PNG, GIF, JPEG, JPEG 2000 and HEIC file formats
 Reading BMP, PDF, SVG, PICT, and XBM file formats
 Layers and layer merging effects
 Text layers
 Individual editing of layer channels
 Transparency effects and transparency in gradients
 Arbitrary selection regions (i.e. through a lasso tool)
 Anti-aliased paint brushes
 User defined brushes and textures
 6 gradient effects
 Graphics tablet support
 Plug-in filter effects
 Core Image Filters
 Color levels and histograms

See also

 GIMP
 Pixelmator
 Paintbrush
 Comparison of raster graphics editors

References

External links
 Download Seashore on the Mac App Store
 Seashore on GitHub
 Original SourceForge site: 
 How to use Seashore videos

Free graphics software
Free software programmed in Objective-C
MacOS-only free software
Raster graphics editors